Guggi (born Derek Rowen) is an avant-garde Irish artist, once a member of the goth/post-punk band Virgin Prunes alongside his close friend Gavin Friday.

Guggi was born in Dublin in 1959. He grew up with and remains best friends with U2's Bono. In 1984 he left the Virgin Prunes to pursue his passion for art. Since then he has exhibited his minimalistic paintings and representations of bowls and vessels in various galleries, including the Tony Shafrazi Gallery in New York, the Osborne Samuel Gallery in London and the Solomon Gallery in Dublin.

Guggi is the older brother of Peter Rowen, a photographer who as a child appeared on many of U2's release covers, and Jonny Rowen, a musician. Another brother, Trevor (Strongman), played bass in the Virgin Prunes.

He lives in Dublin with his wife Sibylle and their four sons along with one son from a previous long-term relationship.

References

External links 
 
 Virgin Prunes

Irish rock musicians
20th-century Irish painters
21st-century Irish painters
Irish male painters
Bono
Musicians from Dublin (city)
Living people
1959 births
Virgin Prunes members